The Korean Super Cup was the annual curtain-raiser to the South Korean football season from 1999 to 2006, and was contested between the champions of K League and Korean FA Cup. It was dropped from the South Korean football calendar in 2007. After that, champions of K League 1 and Korean FA Cup are often scheduled to play each other at the opening match of K League 1 next season. Jeonbuk Hyundai Motors is the only club to have lifted the Super Cup trophy among the champions of FA Cup.

Sponsorship

Rules
 K League champions and Korean FA Cup champions participated in a single match.
 Matches took place at the home venue of the league champions.
 When the match finished as a draw after normal time, it decided on winners after extra time and a penalty shoot-out.

Champions

List of champions

Titles by club
 K League's principle of official statistics is that final club succeeds to predecessor club's history & records.

Results

See also
 K League
 Korean FA Cup
 K League Championship
 Korean League Cup

References

External links
Results at RSSSF

K League
Korea Republic
Super Cup
Recurring sporting events established in 1999
Recurring events disestablished in 2006